Namig Yadulla Abdullayev (born 4 January 1971) is a retired Azerbaijani freestyle wrestler, who won a gold medal at the 2000 Summer Olympics, as well as three gold medals at European championships and three silver medals at world championships.

A three-time Olympian, Abdullayev won the silver medal at the 1996 Summer Olympics in the 52 kg category and the gold in the 55 kg weight class at the 2000 Summer Olympics. He also competed at the 2004 Summer Olympics, but was eliminated early.

Abdullayev retired in 2009.

He was one of the four winners of Young Lions of Azerbaijan 2022, and represented the country at the 2022 Cannes Lions International Festival of Creativity.

Personal life
Abdullayev is married and lives in Baku. He is the brother of world champion wrestler Arif Abdullayev.

References

External links

 Namig Abdullayev's profile

1971 births
Living people
Olympic wrestlers of Azerbaijan
Wrestlers at the 1996 Summer Olympics
Wrestlers at the 2000 Summer Olympics
Azerbaijani male sport wrestlers
Wrestlers at the 2004 Summer Olympics
Olympic gold medalists for Azerbaijan
Olympic silver medalists for Azerbaijan
Sportspeople from Baku
Olympic medalists in wrestling
World Wrestling Championships medalists
Medalists at the 2000 Summer Olympics
Medalists at the 1996 Summer Olympics
European Wrestling Champions
20th-century Azerbaijani people
21st-century Azerbaijani people